The 1985–86 season was Cardiff City F.C.'s 59th season in the Football League. They competed in the 24-team Division Three, then the third tier of English football, finishing twenty-second, suffering relegation to Division Four.

At the end of the season manager Alan Durban was sacked as manager. It ended a disastrous spell in charge as the team suffered two relegations in two years.

Players

First team squad.

League standings

Results by round

Fixtures and results

Third Division

Source

Milk Cup

FA Cup

Welsh Cup

Freight Rover Trophy

See also

List of Cardiff City F.C. seasons

References

Bibliography

Welsh Football Data Archive

1985-86
English football clubs 1985–86 season
Welsh football clubs 1985–86 season
Cardiff City F.C.